A dancer is a person who dances.

Dancer(s) may also refer to:

Film
 Dancers (film), a 1987 American film starring Mikhail Baryshnikov
 Dancer (1991 film), a Bollywood film
 Billy Elliot (working title Dancer), a 2000 British film
 Dancer (2005 film), a Tamil film
 Dancer (2016 film), an American documentary film

Music
 "Dancer" (Gino Soccio song), 1979
 "Dancer" (Queen song), 1982
 "Dancer", a song by Flo Rida, 2018
 "Dancer", a song by the Michael Schenker Group from Assault Attack, 1982

People
 Dancer (surname)
 Dancer baronets, an Irish title

Science and technology
 Argia, or dancers, a genus of damselflies
 DAnCER (database), a biological database
 Dancer (electric bus), a Lithuanian battery-powered vehicle
 Dancer (software), a web application framework

Other uses
 Dancer (novel), a 2003 novel by Colum McCann
 Dancer, one of Santa Claus's reindeer

See also
 Dance (disambiguation)
 The Dance (disambiguation)
 The Dancer (disambiguation), a list of films
 The Dancers (disambiguation)